Daayiee Abdullah (born Sidney Thompson ) is an American Imam based in Washington, D.C. Abdullah is said to be one of five openly gay Imams in the world (the others being Muhsin Hendricks of South Africa, Ludovic-Mohamed Zahed of France, El-Farouk Khaki of Toronto's el-Tawhid Juma Circle/The Unity Mosque, and Nur Warsame of Australia). Abdullah was a member of and spiritual advisor of the Al-Fatiha Foundation until it closed in 2011.  
As a Muslim leader, Abdullah's homosexuality has caused controversy due to the traditionally upheld beliefs about male homosexuality in Islam.

Early life and education
Abdullah was born in 1954 as Sidney Thompson in Detroit, Michigan. He is African American. His parents supported him, his six older brothers, his younger sister, and his oldest step-sister from his father's first marriage to find religion despite his parents' Southern Baptist beliefs. When he was 8 years old, he visited a Synagogue, a Hindu temple, and an assortment of Christian denominations. None of these religions he had explored fit him exactly, so he continued to search for a religion he could put his faith into. He converted to Islam at age 30.
When Abdullah was 15, he graduated from high school early because he had gone to summer school most summers.  Along with summer school, he and his family traveled around North America so that he could see what the world was truly like.  His parents believed that once a member of the family had graduated high school, he was an adult.  Knowing this, Abdullah came out to his parents, and was accepted after assuring his parents that they had "done nothing wrong."  Abdullah has said that he knew he was attracted to other boys at the age of five.  His parents, now both deceased, were a source of inspiration and confidence for him growing up.

Abdullah was a Community Scholar at Georgetown University studying Chinese and graduated from the David A. Clarke School of Law in Washington, D.C. in 1995 as a juris doctor. He attended the Graduate School of Islamic Social Sciences in Ashburn, Virginia from 2000 to 2003, but was kicked out when the school discovered he was gay.

Career

In 1978, Abdullah went to Washington D.C. for a conference because he was working for Governor Jerry Brown's office in San Francisco.  Then, in 1979 he returned to D.C. for the National March on Washington for Lesbian and Gay Rights as one of the coordinators.  Because he was a coordinator, he went a week early and then stayed a week later for his vacation only to return a month later.  After two weeks in San Francisco, he decided that he wanted to live in D.C.
In the 80's Abdullah began his tenure at Georgetown University and spent several years at Beijing University and Taiwan National University Beijing University.  He studied the Chinese language and literature, and later Arabic, Arabic Linguistics, North African, and Middle Eastern Studies, and several years working and studying in Muslim countries. Some of his classmates were from Ürümqi, and were Chinese Muslims.  They asked him what he knew of Islam, which led to being invited to his very first Beijing Mosque.  At this first mosque, Abdullah understood everything that was being said and knew this was the faith he had been searching for. At age 30, he became a Muslim and chose to sometimes go by the name Daayiee Abdullah. He didn't add on the title Imam until later.

Around 2000, he joined the online Yahoo! group Muslim Gay Men.  On this forum, there were many who were gay, but were intent on telling those who were seeking help that the Qur'an forbids homosexuality.  Abdullah refuted these comments by explaining that one is to follow the Qur'an first and the Haddith second. Through this, he began to gain popularity among homosexuals and allies across the online community.
One of the reasons he had begun to be called Imam was because he has performed many ceremonies for people in who were considered pariahs in their community due to illnesses or the gender or religion of the person they wished to marry.  A few gay Muslims died of AIDS, and no one would do their Janazah.  Abdullah also performed same-sex marriages for men and women and counseling for all couples—heterosexual and homosexual.  Along with performing these ceremonies that others would not, he married mixed couples and religiously differing couples who are from the Abrahamic faith.  Because the Abrahamic faiths are sister religions, and because the Qu'ran says that Abrahamic believers can interact with other Abrahamic believers, Abdullah believes that it is plausible to marry between Abrahamic religions.

He was the business manager at Georgetown Fitness Center from 2007 to 2009. Abdullah, under his legal name Sidney Thompson, is the CEO of Asiad & Associates, a software company in Washington, D.C.

Masjid Nur Al-Isslaah
Abdullah created an LGBT-friendly masjid in Washington D.C. Later, in 2011, he helped create a mosque for anyone who wanted to attend located in a public library in D.C.  The plan is to raise funds to create a purpose-built mosque of their own where all are free to worship. Since 2000, Abdullah has provided specialized counseling services for Muslims from a wide spectrum of Muslim religious and cultural backgrounds.

Abdullah is the imam and religious director of Masjid Nur Al-Isslaah (English: "Mosque for Enlightenment and Reformation" or "Light of Reform Mosque"), an LGBT-welcoming mosque. Imam Daayiee was Director of LGBT Outreach at Muslims for Progressive Values from 2010 until 2014 and remains on the Advisory Board of Muslims for Progressive Values.  He also holds a position in Oslo, Norway at Skeiv Verden ("Gay World").  Since 2014, Imam Daayiee Abdullah is Executive Director of MECCA Institute, an educational and research organization whose mission is to help re-educate Muslims and non-Muslims on an inclusive and progressive Islamic theology.

Al-Fatiha Foundation
Abdullah was a board member of the round table of the Al-Fatiha Foundation for several years. From 2011 to 2012, he served as part of the Queer Muslim Working Group, which evolved into the Muslim Alliance for Sexual and Gender Diversity in 2013. Abdullah also has served on the planning team for the LGBT Muslim Retreat since 2011.

Personal life
In 2006, Abdullah was in a long-term relationship of ten years. His partner was Christian, which is one of the reasons he performs religious ceremonies between Abrahamic religions.

As of 2015, Abdullah was declared single, claiming that the pressure on his closeted partner was too much for the relationship.

See also
African American Muslim converts
LGBT in Islam
Al-Fatiha Foundation Fatwa

References 

 A Man for All Seasons Imam Daayiee Abdullah offers a gay Muslim's insights for the holidays by Will O'Bryan, Metro Weekly magazine, December 21, 2006
 
 Imam Daayiee Abdullah welcomes gay Muslims to worship, marry by Emily Wax, The Washington Post, April 17, 2013
 Could This Be America’s First Out Imam? by Matthew Breen, Out Magazine, December 23, 2013

External links

 Light of Reform Mosque, Washington, D.C.
LinkedIn Profile

American imams
LGBT African Americans
American LGBT rights activists
1954 births
Living people
Gay Muslims
American gay men
African-American religious leaders
American Muslim activists
African-American Sunni Muslims
Sunni imams
LGBT people from Michigan
Religious leaders from Michigan
Converts to Islam from Christianity
David A. Clarke School of Law alumni
Georgetown College (Georgetown University) alumni
African-American activists
20th-century imams
21st-century imams
Activists from Detroit
21st-century American LGBT people